The 1991 Youngstown State Penguins football team represented Youngstown State University in the 1991 NCAA Division I-AA football season. The Penguins were led by sixth-year head coach Jim Tressel and played their home games at Stambaugh Stadium. They finished the season 12–3. They received an at-large bid to the I-AA playoffs, where they defeated Villanova, Nevada, and Samford to advance to the National Championship Game, where they defeated Marshall. This was their first national championship in school history.

Schedule

References

Youngstown State
Youngstown State Penguins football seasons
NCAA Division I Football Champions
Youngstown State Penguins football